The State University of New York at Cortland (SUNY Cortland, C-State, or Cortland State College) is a public college in Cortland, New York. It was founded in 1868 and is part of the State University of New York (SUNY) system.

History
The State University of New York Cortland was founded in 1868 as the Cortland Normal School. It included among its earliest students inventor and industrialist Elmer A. Sperry of Sperry Rand Corp.

The campus continually grew, and in 1941, by an act of legislature and the board of regents, the institution became a four-year college providing courses leading to a bachelor's degree and soon was widely acknowledged as Cortland State Teachers College. In 1948, Cortland was a founding member of the State University of New York.

On January 1, 2023 the State University of New York changed the name of the college from State University of New York College at Cortland to State University of New York at Cortland.

Campus
Cortland is off of Interstate 81, between Syracuse and Binghamton. Fourteen of these structures are residence halls that provide housing for approximately 3,000 students. SUNY Cortland also operates its Outdoor Education Center at Raquette Lake in the Adirondacks, the Hoxie Gorge Nature Preserve outside Cortland, and the Brauer Education Center on the Helderberg Escarpment near Albany.

The U.S. Department of the Interior in 2004 designated Camp Pine Knot, now known as the Huntington Memorial Camp and part of its Outdoor Education center at Raquette Lake, as the first and only National Historic Landmark within the State University of New York (SUNY). Camp Pine Knot was the first Great Camp of the Adirondacks and the birthplace of what is now known as the Adirondack style of architecture. SUNY Cortland has 55,000 alumni who live in all 50 states and in more than 40 countries.

Organization and administration
Cortland is a comprehensive college within the State University of New York system.

Academics
Today, approximately 6,800 students are pursuing degrees within the college's three academic divisions—arts and sciences, education and professional studies. Twenty-eight academic departments with a faculty of more than 600 offer the SUNY Cortland student body 50 majors and 38 minors from which to choose, plus 33 graduate majors and four certificates of advanced study.

Student life
SUNY Cortland has over 100 student clubs.

In 2015, the school opened a $56 million Student Life Center (SLC).

Athletics

The Cortland Red Dragons are the athletic teams for SUNY Cortland. The college competes in NCAA Division III in the State University of New York Athletic Conference for most sports. Football played in the New Jersey Athletic Conference from 2000 to 2014, and became an affiliate member of the Empire 8 in 2015. Wrestling competes in the Empire Collegiate Wrestling Conference, the women's ice hockey team competes in the ECAC West, women's gymnastics is a National Collegiate Gymnastics Association (NCGA) East member, and women's golf is an independent, as those sports are not offered by the SUNYAC.

SUNY Cortland has had the most regional successful men's and women's intercollegiate athletics program in New York over the past two decades. In 1995, the Sears Directors' Cup was established to gauge and recognize the most successful intercollegiate athletics programs in the nation. SUNY Cortland is one of only five colleges and universities in the U.S. to have finished every year among the Top 25 NCAA Division III programs. Cortland placed 12th out of approximately 440 schools during the 2015–16 competition that is now known as the Learfield Sports Directors' Cup. The competition is sponsored by USA Today, the National Association of Collegiate Directors of Athletics, and Learfield Sports. The standings are based on schools' national finishes in different sports.

The Cortland Red Dragons annually play Ithaca College Bombers for the Cortaca Jug, which was added in 1959 to an already competitive rivalry. The match-up is one of the most prominent in Division III college football. It was called the "biggest little game in the nation" by Sports Illustrated in 1991. The Red Dragons had a seven-game winning streak as of November 2016, but lost 48–20 in 2017. They also play the Cortaca Mic game every Friday before the Cortaca Jug game. Which is played between the Ithaca (WICB) and Cortland (WSUC) school radio stations. Cortland has never lost this game since it has been played.

Cortland also plays rival SUNY school Oswego each year for the "Dragon Sword" in Women's Field Hockey. The sword was donated by Oswego alumni Kimberlee (Bennett) and Michael Champitto and began pay annually in 1999. As of 2021 Cortland has never failed to capture the sword at this event.  

Cortland snapped Salisbury University's 69-game win streak to capture the 2006 NCAA Men's Lacrosse Div. III National Championship. The team reached the 2007 and 2008 national championship in rematch games against Salisbury University. The lacrosse team cemented its spot as a premier team with its second Division III national championship in 2009, defeating Gettysburg in the finals.

In 2006 as part of its Silver Anniversary of sponsoring women's sports, the NCAA named the SUNY Cortland women's cross country program as its top cross country program of the past 25 years. The Cortland women captured seven NCAA Division III national championships in a nine-year span between 1989 and 1997 (1989, 1991–95, 1997). In addition, the Cortland men's cross country team won the 2008 NCAA Div. III championship.

In all, Cortland teams have won 25 national titles, including 18 NCAA crowns. Along with the titles mentioned above, the field hockey team won NCAA Div. III titles in 1993, 1994 and 2001, the women's outdoor track and field team won an NCAA Div. III title in 1985 and the women's indoor track and field team was the 1991 NCAA Div. III champion. The men's lacrosse squad won the NCAA Div. II title in 1975 and the USILA College Division championship in 1973. The women's soccer won the 1992 NCAA Div. III tournament and captured the first-ever U.S. National Women's Soccer Championship in 1980, defeating UCLA in the finals. The men's gymnastics team won USGF Div. II-III titles in 1986, 1987, 1989 and 1990. The baseball and Women's Lacrosse teams each won their first ever Div. III titles in 2015. The women's lacrosse team won 18 SUNYAC titles between 1997 and 2015.

Cortland previously hosted the summer training camp of the NFL's New York Jets from 2009 to 2014, except for 2011 due to the NFL lockout.

International Exchange Program
SUNY Cortland has 18 partner universities across the world such as the German Sport University Cologne and the Griffith University in Australia.

Notable people

Alumni

 Zane Lamprey, television host, actor, and writer
 John P. Allegrante, Charles Irwin Lambert Professor of Health Behavior and Education at Teachers College, Columbia University
 David L. Brainard, U.S. Army brigadier general
 George Breen, Olympic swimmer/medalist
 Joseph H. Brownell, member of the New York State Assembly
 C. B. Bucknor, current Major League Baseball umpire
 Ted Demme, film director and producer
 Ann E. Dunwoody, first female four-star officer in the history of the U.S. Army and 2011 NCAA Theodore Roosevelt Award winner
 Mick Foley, former professional wrestler and author
 John Franchi (B.A. in Liberal Arts), professional mixed martial artist for the WEC's featherweight division
 Brian Giorgis, Marist College women's basketball head coach
 Scott Israel (BA, '77), former sheriff of Broward County, Florida, current police chief of Opa-locka, Florida.
 Kevin James, comedian, television and film actor
 Sid Jamieson, head lacrosse coach at Bucknell University
 Suad Joseph, Professor of Anthropology and Women and Gender Studies at the University of California, and General Editor of the Encyclopedia of Women and Islamic Cultures
 Michael N. Kane, lawyer, judge, and politician
 Catherine Samali Kavuma, Ugandan author, World Bank executive, and former Ugandan ambassador to the US
 Fern Kupfer, author and professor
 Clayton Lusk, lawyer and politician and Acting Lieutenant Governor of New York in 1922
 Scott Manning, former professional soccer player, 1980 Olympian
 Tamdan McCrory (B.S. in Kinesiology), professional mixed martial artist for the UFC's Middleweight Division
 Nathan L. Miller, 43rd Governor of New York
 John Moiseichik, basketball player
 Toby Orenstein, founder and director of the Columbia Center for Theatrical Arts, the Young Columbians, and Toby's Dinner Theatre (did not graduate)
 Greg Sankey, Commissioner of the Southeastern Conference
 Matt Senk, college baseball coach at Stony Brook
 Jake Steinfeld, actor, entrepreneur (Body by Jake), and television personality (did not graduate)
 Aljamain Sterling (B.A. in Physical Education), two-time NCAA D-III All-American wrestler; professional mixed martial artist for the UFC
 John Stigall, poet
 George Tenet, former Director of Central Intelligence for the Central Intelligence Agency, and Distinguished Professor in the Practice of Diplomacy at Georgetown University
 William H. Thomas, physician, author, and performer
 Robert Thompson, professor of communications at Syracuse University
 Bill Tierney, NCAA lacrosse player and coach
 R-Kal Truluck, professional football player
 Michael J. Waldvogel, National Lacrosse Hall of Fame member 
 Bob Weinhauer, basketball coach and executive
 Scott Williams, television writer and producer

Faculty
 Thomas Blanchard Stowell, Chair of Natural Sciences (1869–1889)
 Robert S. Newman, anthropology (1973)
 Robert Spitzer, political science (1979–present)

References

External links
Official website
Official athletics website

Cortland, State University of New York
Education in Cortland County, New York

Public universities and colleges in New York (state)